The 1994 season was Molde's seventh season in the second tier of Norwegian football since 1963, the first since their last promotion to the first tier in 1983. This season Molde competed in 1. divisjon and the Norwegian Cup.

In 1. divisjon's group 2, Molde finished in 2nd position, 4 points behind winners Hødd and were promoted to the 1995 Tippeligaen. 

Molde participated in the 1994 Norwegian Cup. They won the final 3–2 against Lyn and won their first major trophy in the club's history.

Squad
Source:

 (on loan from Lierse)

Friendlies

Competitions

1. divisjon

Results summary

Positions by round

Results

League table

Norwegian Cup

Final

Squad statistics

Appearances and goals
Appearance statistics from Norwegian Cup rounds 2–4 are incomplete.

        
    

|}

Goalscorers

See also
Molde FK seasons

References

External links
nifs.no

1994
Molde